Soccer Bowl '83 was the 17th edition of the Soccer Bowl, the championship match of North American Soccer League (NASL), which took place on October 1, 1983. It was the final match of the 1983 North American Soccer League playoffs and was contested by the Tulsa Roughnecks and the Toronto Blizzard at BC Place Stadium in Vancouver, British Columbia.

Background

Tulsa Roughnecks
The Tulsa Roughnecks won the Southern Division with a 17-13 record and a total of 145 points. They dispatched the Fort Lauderdale Strikers in the quarterfinals with a two-game sweep. By virtue of their two games to one victory In the semifinals against the Montreal Manic, the Roughnecks advanced to the Soccer Bowl for the first time in franchise history.

Toronto Blizzard
The Toronto Blizzard qualified for the playoffs as a wild card by finishing third in the Eastern Division with a 16-14 record and a total of 135 points. In the quarterfinals they were the upset-winner over the Western Division champion Vancouver Whitecaps by two games to one. Vancouver had only lost 6 matches all season. The Blizzard pulled off a second upset in their semifinal match-up by sweeping the Golden Bay Earthquakes in two games, and earning their second ever trip to the Soccer Bowl.

Pre-match controversy
During game three of their semifinal series with Montreal, Tulsa forward Ron Futcher picked up his third yellow card of the playoffs. By rule this earned him a one-match suspension, and league director of operations Ted Howard was poised to enforce it. For his part, Futcher was not only the team's leading scorer, but also a leader in the Roughnecks' locker room. Tulsa's owners appealed the yellow card and even alluded to the press, the possibility of boycotting the final if Futcher was not allowed to play. Toronto team president Clive Toye felt that bending the rules for a star player might set a bad precedent, but was nevertheless prepared to face whatever lineup Tulsa put on the pitch. Ultimately, NASL president Howard J. Samuels overruled Ted Howard and decided to allow Futcher to play, because he felt that the fans in attendance would be the ones made to suffer by Futcher's absence.

Match details 

1983 NASL Champions: Tulsa Roughnecks

Television: Budwieser Network (syndicated)
Announcers: Bob Carpenter, Gordon BradleyTouchline reporter: Al Miller

Match statistics

See also 
 1983 North American Soccer League season

References 

1983
1983 in Canadian soccer
 
1983
Toronto Blizzard matches
Sport in Vancouver
1983 in British Columbia
Sports competitions in Vancouver
October 1983 sports events in Canada